The Dumbéa River is a river of New Caledonia. It has a catchment area of 233 square kilometres. It is a beautiful river, and flows from the Diahot River.

See also
List of rivers of New Caledonia

References

Rivers of New Caledonia